Louis-Xavier Eyma (16 October 1816 – 20 March 1876) was a 19th-century French journalist and writer, author, among others, of novels, travel books and theater plays.

Biography 
Born in Martinique, an illegitimate son of Louis, a French lawyer who had long worked in New Orleans and Victorine Eyma, Xavier Eyma studied in France and joined the Navy administration in Paris in 1836. He began to write in the Parisian press and in 1840 obtained a first success with his novel Le Médaillon.

Charged with a mission to West Indies in order to study education there (1845), he also traveled to the United States (1846) as French correspondent of the newspaper  La Chronique , which inspired him several travel stories. An editor at the Journal des actionnaires when he was back in France, he returned in 1858 to New-Orleans where his father lived, and worked there as director of the French section of L'Abeille (1858–1859). Among several American personalities, he engaged into a friendship with Washington Irving and visited the plains of Ohio, Mammoth Cave, Leavenworth and Philadelphia.

In New Orleans, he attended the arrival of the rest of the tribe of Seminole on their way to deportation in Arkansas. Although an admirer of the United States, Eyma condemned slavery and the massacre of Indians in his writings.

He then visited Cuba and after he returned to France in 1861, he worked for many newspapers including Le Figaro and La Liberté.

His plays were presented on the most important Parisian stages of the 19th century including Théâtre du Vaudeville, Théâtre des Variétés, and Théâtre de la Porte-Saint-Martin.

Director of Nouvelliste de Paris (1874–1876), he also translated American authors such as Ralph Waldo Emerson (Les lois de la vie 1864, The Conduct of Life) and Washington Irving (Histoire de la conquête de Grenade 1865, Chronicle of the Conquest of Granada).

Works 

1840: Écrivains et artistes vivants, français et étrangers, biographies, 3 vols.
1840: Le Médaillon, novel
1841: Emmanuel, poems
1842 Introduction à une politique générale
1842: L'Abandon !, song
1849: Album de 10 mélodies pour voix et piano, with Charles Delange and Francis Tourte
1849: Le Croiseur, sea song
1849: Dolorita, chanson catalane
1850: Capitaine... de quoi ?, one-act comédie en vaudeville, with Amédée de Jallais
1851: Le Renard et les raisins, comédie en vaudeville en 1 acte, with de Jallais
1852: Les cent écus de Claude, feuilleton
1853: Les Deux Amériques, histoire, mœurs et voyages, report
1853: Le Mariage au bâton, one-act comédie en vaudeville, with Déaddé Saint-Yves
1853: Les Femmes du nouveau monde
1854: Les Peaux-Rouges, scènes de la vie des Indiens, report
1857: Les Peaux-Noires, scènes de la vie des esclaves, report
1860: Le Roi des Tropiques
1860: Le Trône d'argent
1861: Aventuriers et corsaires, Michel Lévy
1861: Le Canal maritime du Darien, état de la question
1861: La République américaine, ses institutions, ses hommes
1862: Le roman de Flavio (Naples en 1798), novel, Michel Lévy
1862: Scènes de mœurs et de voyages dans le Nouveau-Monde
1862: La vie dans le Nouveau-Monde, récit, Poulet-Malassis
1862: Les Trente-quatre étoiles de l'Union américaine
1863: Légendes, fantômes et récits du Nouveau-Monde, 2 vols.
1863: Les Poches de mon parrain, roman, 2 vols.
1864: De la Circulation libre des coupons à revenu fixe
1865: Nice et les Alpes-Maritimes, sites pittoresques, monuments, description et histoire des arrondissements de Nice, de Puget-Théniers et de Grasse composant ce nouveau département, texte descriptif et historique, with Joseph Dessaix
1866: La Chasse à l'esclave, novel
1867: La Mansarde de Rose, followed by Thérèse Lorrain, novel, A. Faure
1868: Tobine, bolero
1874: 20 Mélodies, piano et chant, with Victor Hugo
1874: Les Gamineries de Mme Rivière
1876: La Vie aux États-Unis, notes de voyage, Plon
1877: Les amoureux de la demoiselle, novel, Dentu
undated: Les Deux manoirs
undated: Excentricités américaines
undated: Le Grand cordon et la corde
undated: Mademoiselle Topaze
undated: Le Masque blanc
undated Monrose...

Bibliography 
 Jack Corzani, Littérature antillaise (poésie), 1971, 
 Edward Larocque Tinker, Les écrits de langue française en Louisiane au XIXe, 1975, 
 Numa Broc, Dictionnaire des Explorateurs français du XIXe siècle, T.3, Amérique, CTHS, 1999, 
 Dominique Chancé, Histoire des littératures antillaises, 2005,

External links 
 Xavier Eyma on Data.bnf.fr

19th-century French journalists
French male journalists
19th-century French novelists
19th-century French dramatists and playwrights
French chansonniers
English–French translators
19th-century French poets
1816 births
Martiniquais dramatists and playwrights
1876 deaths
19th-century French male writers
Martiniquais journalists
Martiniquais novelists
19th-century French translators